Bhadsa Manopur is a village located in Maunath Bhanjan tehsil of Mau district, Uttar Pradesh. It has total 494 families residing. Bhadsa Manopur has population of 3,623 as per government records. This village is located at a distance of 11 km towards north from district headquarter Mau. The village is well connected with nearby towns as it situated on the Varanasi-Gorakhpur Highway.

In earlier times, the population was primarily involved in farming, but now people have moved to other jobs. The literacy rate of this village is also quite high as compared with the state average which resulted in the shift from agriculture as primary source of income.

Notable People from the village who are in prominent positions in service are Bhupendra Rai (High Court Judge), Narsingh Narain Rai (Advocate at Supreme Court of India), Smt. Suman Rai (Assistant Commissioner of Commercial Tax), Jitendra Rai (Pilot), Jai Prakash Rai (Principal).Dr.Subash Rai(Retired Medical Officer)

Administration
Bhadsa Manopur village is administrated by Pradhan who is elected representative of village as per constitution of India and Panchyati Raaj Act. This village comes under Kopaganj development block.

Nearby places
Azamgarh
Barhalganj
Dohrighat
Ghosi
Gorakhpur
Kasara, Mau
Kopaganj
Mau
Shahroj, Mau

References

External links
Villages in Mau  Uttar Pradesh

Villages in Mau district